Naghdi may refer to:
 Naghdi, Iran (disambiguation), places in Iran
 Mohammadreza Naghdi, Iranian paramilitary commander
 Paul M. Naghdi, Iranian scientist
 Yasmine Naghdi, British ballet dancer